Veyangoda railway station is a railway station in the Western Province, Sri Lanka. The station is served by Sri Lanka Railways, which is the state-run railway operator.

Location
Veyangoda railway station is located in the centre of the town of Veyangoda. Veyangoda railway station is one of the busiest stations in the Gampaha District, with most of the trains excluding intercity express stopping at the station. Next to station, there is road crossing, which has the highest number of crossings in Sri Lanka.

The station has four platforms and one siding line with crossing loop and functions as a commuter rail terminus.

History 
The station is one of the first five railway stations constructed in Sri Lanka. The original station was opened on 27 December 1864, when the first passenger train, carrying the Duke of Brabant, Leopold II, and operated by Guilford Lindsey Molesworth (Chief Railway Engineer), ran from Veyangoda to Ambepussa and returned to Colombo. The line however wasn't officially opened for traffic until 2 October 1865 and the Veyangoda station wasn't completed until 1866.

In 2016 the Minister of Transport and Civil Aviation, Nimal Siripala de Silva, announced that the government would be electrifying the railway line from Veyangoda to Panadura over the next three years.

Continuity

See also 
List of railway stations in Sri Lanka
List of railway stations in Sri Lanka by line
Sri Lanka Railways

References

External links 
Cutting the First Sod of Earth for the Railway in 1858

Railway stations in Gampaha District
Railway stations on the Main Line (Sri Lanka)
Railway stations opened in 1864